Diary of a Wimpy Kid: Old School is a children's novel written by American author Jeff Kinney first published in 2015. It is the tenth book of Diary of a Wimpy Kid series, preceded by Diary of a Wimpy Kid: The Long Haul and followed by Diary of a Wimpy Kid: Double Down. The book was released on November 3, 2015 worldwide, though an extract from the book was released online on October 27, 2015.

Plot
Greg Heffley talks about how his mother does not like technology and smartphones, and is starting a petition to prevent the town from using electronic devices for a weekend. As his school year starts, Greg wants to try something different, so he signs up for the Homework Buddies program. At home, Greg's grandfather moves in with them after the rent is raised at his retirement home and his girlfriend breaks up with him. After Greg forgets to screw the toothpaste cap back on, his father Frank lectures him about how small things can lead to big consequences.

Greg hears about a school trip to an old-fashioned farm, which he decides not to attend. His mother gets enough signatures for her petition, so the next day, Greg attends a park cleanup. He gets tired and runs away, then meets up with his Homework Buddy. A teenager doing community service follows them as well, and when they are soon located by the adults, Greg pins the blame on him.

Back at home, while his parents are away, Greg tries to put the toothpaste cap back on after brushing his teeth, but it falls down the drain. He loosens a pipe to get it, but forgets to turn off the water valve first, causing a puddle of water to leak downstairs. His grandfather tells him that they can buy paint and cover up the stain, but while on the road, he drives the wrong direction and the car runs out of gas. Greg accidentally moves the car, which falls into a ditch, and his mom arrives. He decides to go on the trip to get out of town and avoid facing punishment from Frank.

After arriving at the farm, Greg hears rumors about a deranged farmer named Silas Scratch who still wanders around the area. The kids struggle to adapt to their uncomfortable cabins, with one named Julian eating part of his deodorant stick to become sick as an excuse to leave, causing the chaperones to confiscate all their deodorant so they do not try to eat it. Greg and his cabinmates decide to raid other cabins for deodorant.

They steal one of the teachers' bags, and after they are caught, Frank, Greg's dad is called as an emergency chaperone. While gathering firewood for the final night of camp, which is spent outside, Greg comes across an old shack that he thinks Silas Scratch lives in. It turns out to be a clean maintenance shed. Greg encounters his dad, who explains that he invented the rumor about Silas Scratch to prevent people from coming in the shack, which he had used as shelter himself. Frank sneaks everybody into the cabin to sleep. Greg figures that he might be stuck chaperoning at the farm when he is older, and he will want to use the shack as well, so he continues to spread rumors about Silas Scratch as he leaves.

Marketing
The book was announced on March 9, 2015. The cover, color, and title were revealed on April 27, 2015 during a live stream co-hosted by Jeff Kinney, with appearances from Robert Capron live on stage, and Zachary Gordon through a video call. At the 2015 Diary of a Wimpy Kid Virtually Live Event, Jeff Kinney stated that the book is black because he believes that black is a cartoonist's favorite color. An extract from the book was released exclusively by The Guardian on June 29, 2015.

References

External links
 Official website

2015 American novels
2015 children's books
Diary of a Wimpy Kid
Novels by Jeff Kinney
Amulet Books books
Puffin Books books